The 2009 FIM Speedway World Championship Grand Prix of Sweden will be the third race of the 2009 Speedway Grand Prix season. It took place on 30 May 2009, in the Ullevi Stadium in Gothenburg, Sweden.

The Swedish Grand Prix was won by Russian junior Emil Sayfutdinov who beat in the final Australian Jason Crump and Swedish wild card Antonio Lindbäck. It was second Sayfutdinov' winning in his third Grand Prix.

Riders 

The Speedway Grand Prix Commission nominated Antonio Lindbäck as the wild card and Ricky Kling and Simon Gustafsson as the first and second track reserves. However, Gustafsson suffered a broken collar bone when he crashed during a Swedish league match on 5 May, and his replacement will be Thomas H. Jonasson. The riders' starting positions draw for Grand Prix meeting was made on 29 May at 13:00 CET.

 Draw Nr 18 change:  (18) Simon Gustafsson →  (18) Thomas H. Jonasson

Heat details

Heat after heat 

 (70.9) Harris, Crump, Hancock, Sayfutdinov
 (71.1) Ułamek, Bjerre, Adams, Nicholls
 (69.7) Pedersen, Lindbäck, Jonsson, Gollob
 (69.4) Holta, Lindgren, Walasek, Andersen
 (70.7) Holta, Lindbäck, Ułamek, Harris
 (69.8) Jonsson, Andersen, Adams, Hancock (F2x) Hancock crashed on first lap and is excluded.
 (69.4) Crump, Gollob, Lindgren, Nicholls
 (70.2) Pedersen, Sayfutdinov, Walasek, Bjerre
 (72.2) Gollob, Walasek, Adams, Harris
 (71.1) Hancock, Lindgren, Pedersen, Ułamek
 (70.5) Lindbäck, Bjerre, Crump, Andersen
 (69.7) Sayfutdinov, Jonsson, Holta, Nicholls
 (70.4) Andersen, Harris, Pedersen, Nicholls
 (70.0) Bjerre, Holta, Hancock, Gollob
 (69.9) Jonsson, Crump, Ułamek, Walasek
 (69.8) Sayfutdinov, Lindbäck, Lindgren, Adams
 (70.4) Lindgren, Jonsson, Bjerre, Harris
 (71.2) Lindbäck, Walasek, Nicholls, Hancock (E1)
 (71.1) Pedersen, Crump, Holta, Adams
 (70.1) Sayfutdinov, Gollob, Ułamek, Andersen (Fx) Andersen and Ulamek collided on first lap. Andersen excluded.
 Semi-Finals:
 (71.2) Lindbäck, Crump, Jonsson, Lindgren (F3x) Lindgren falls on lap 3 and is excluded.
 (70.5) Sayfutdinov, Pedersen, Holta, Bjerre
 The Final:
 (70.4) Sayfutdinov (6 pts), Crump (4 pts), Lindbäck (2 pts) Pedersen (X) Sayfutdinov and Crump crash. Pedersen excluded.

The intermediate classification

See also 
 Speedway Grand Prix
 List of Speedway Grand Prix riders

References

External links 
 FIM-live.com 

Sweden
2009
2009 in Swedish motorsport